Goodenia minutiflora  is a species of flowering plant in the family Goodeniaceae and is endemic to northern Australia. It is an annual herb with linear to lance-shaped leaves, and loose groups of tiny white or purplish flowers.

Description

Taxonomy and naming
Goodenia minutiflora was first formally described in 1874 by Ferdinand von Mueller in Fragmenta Phytographiae Australiae from specimens collected by Thomas Gulliver between the Norman and Gilbert Rivers in Queensland.
The specific epithet (minutiflora) means "very small-flowered".

Distribution and habitat
This goodenia mainly grows on the southern shores of the Gulf of Carpentaria in Queensland and the Northern Territory.

Conservation status
Goodenia minutiflora is classified as of "least concern" under the Queensland Government Nature Conservation Act 1992 and as "data deficient" under the Northern Territory Government Territory Parks and Wildlife Conservation Act 1976.

References

minutiflora
Eudicots of Western Australia
Plants described in 1874
Taxa named by Ferdinand von Mueller
Flora of Queensland
Flora of the Northern Territory